Lieutenant General Mikhail Grigoryevich Yefremov (March 11 1897, Tarusa, Kaluga Governorate – April 19 1942, Vyazemsky District) was a Soviet military commander. He took part in the October Revolution, joined the Russian Communist Party (b) in 1919, and became a division commander in 1921. He also became a military advisor to the National Government of China in 1928. During World War II, he commanded the Central Front in August 1941, and the Soviet 33rd Army from October 1941.

"Lt.-Gen. Yefremov decided to personally lead the striking force of his army" when Zhukov decided to take Vyazma in early February 1942. Gen. Belov's Cavalry Corps was able to join them before the Germans cut them off from other advancing Soviet forces. Operating in the German rear next to Soviet partisans, they were supplied by air until April when they were given permission to link up with the main Soviet forces. Most of Gen. Belov's Cavalry Corps made it to the Soviet 10th Army. However, Yefremov decided to take a shorter route which was detected by the Germans. Subsequently, the 33rd army was destroyed and he committed suicide to avoid being taken prisoner by the Germans. "Most of his heroic men fell alongside him." Yefremov was awarded the Order of the Red Banner. A monument is dedicated to him in Vyazma.

References 

1897 births
1942 deaths
People from Kaluga Oblast
People from Tarussky Uyezd
Bolsheviks
Communist Party of the Soviet Union members
First convocation members of the Soviet of the Union
Soviet lieutenant generals
Imperial Russian Army officers
Russian military personnel of World War I
Soviet military personnel of the Russian Civil War
Soviet military personnel killed in World War II
Heroes of the Russian Federation
Recipients of the Order of Lenin
Recipients of the Order of the Red Banner
Recipients of the Order of the Red Banner of Labour
Soviet military personnel who committed suicide
Suicides in the Soviet Union